The 1982 NCAA Division III baseball tournament was played at the end of the 1982 NCAA Division III baseball season to determine the seventh national champion of college baseball at the NCAA Division III level. The tournament concluded with six teams, for the first time, competing at Pioneer Park in Marietta, Ohio, for the championship. Six regional tournaments were held to determine the participants in the World Series. Regional tournaments were contested in double-elimination format, with one region consisting of six teams, four regions consisting of four teams, and one region consisting of two teams, which was played as best-of-five, for a total of 24 teams participating in the tournament.

Bids
The 24 competing teams were:

Regionals

Mideast Regional

South Regional

Midwest Regional

Mid-Atlantic Regional

West Regional

Northeast Regional

World Series

Participants

Bracket
Pioneer Park-Marietta, OH (Host: Marietta College)

References

NCAA Division III Baseball Tournament
Tournament